Grand Hotel is an American mystery drama television series developed by Brian Tanen, based on the Spanish TV series Gran Hotel created by Ramón Campos and Gema R. Neira. The series premiered on June 17, 2019, on ABC, and stars Demián Bichir, Roselyn Sanchez, Denyse Tontz, Bryan Craig, Wendy Raquel Robinson, Lincoln Younes, Anne Winters, Feliz Ramirez, and Justina Adorno. Grand Hotel is executive produced by Ramón Campos, Teresa Fernández-Valdés, Bob Daily, Bill D'Elia, Eva Longoria Bastón, Ben Spector, and Tanen. Longoria Bastón also appears on the series in a recurring role. Grand Hotel was canceled in October 2019 after one season.

Premise
Set at the Riviera Grand Hotel, the last family-owned hotel in Miami Beach, Grand Hotel follows owner Santiago Mendoza, his glamorous second wife, Gigi, and their adult children, as well as the Riviera's staff.

Cast and characters

Main

 Demián Bichir as Santiago Mendoza, the patriarch of the Mendoza family and owner of the Riviera Grand Hotel, which he inherited from his late wife Beatriz. He is Javi, Alicia and Jason’s father and Carolina and Yoli's stepfather.
 Roselyn Sanchez as Gigi Mendoza, Santiago's second wife who was also Beatriz's best friend. She is Carolina and Yoli's mother and Javi, Alicia and Jason’s stepmother.
 Denyse Tontz as Alicia Mendoza, Santiago's daughter who recently graduated with an MBA from the Cornell University School of Hotel Administration and steps in to help her father manage the ailing hotel
 Bryan Craig as Javi Mendoza, Santiago's disabled playboy son who wants to take on more responsibility
 Wendy Raquel Robinson as Helen "Mrs. P" Parker, the head of staff at the Riviera
 Lincoln Younes as Danny, a recently hired waiter at the Riviera who is investigating the disappearance of his sister Sky, who worked at the hotel
 Shalim Ortiz as Mateo, the hotel manager and Santiago's right-hand man who secretly works for the hotel's creditors
 Anne Winters as Ingrid, a pregnant housekeeper at the Riviera
 Chris Warren as Jason Parker, Mrs. P's son who is later revealed to be Santiago’s biological son. He also works at the Riviera as a waiter
 Feliz Ramirez as Carolina, Gigi's self-obsessed daughter and Yoli's fraternal twin sister
 Justina Adorno as Yoli, Gigi's queer daughter and Carolina's fraternal twin

Recurring

 Arielle Kebbel as Sky Garibaldi, a line chef at the Riviera Grand Hotel who mysteriously disappeared during a hurricane; it is implied she knows something unpleasant about Santiago's past. Sky was also Yoli's secret girlfriend prior to her disappearance.
 Jencarlos Canela as El Rey, the self-proclaimed "King of Miami" and a famous rapper hired by Alicia to help attract new business to the hotel
 John Marshall Jones as Malcolm Parker, Mrs. P's husband and Jason's adoptive father who is also the head of maintenance and facilities at the Riviera; he is diagnosed with lung cancer, following a collapse
 Matt Shively as Nelson, a concierge at the hotel who tries to blackmail Mateo over Sky's disappearance, and winds up getting hit by a truck. Mateo then kills him at the hospital to cover up his secret.
 Sabrina Texidor as Marisa, a masseuse at the Riviera who begins to have a secret romantic relationship with Yoli
 Elizabeth McLaughlin as Heather Davis, Danny's longtime girlfriend back home
 Stefanie Sherk as Dr. Sonja Grant, the hotel doctor at Riviera Grand Hotel
 Adrian Pasdar as Felix, Gigi's ex-husband and Carolina's and Yoli's father, who is currently in hiding after scamming countless investors, including Santiago, out of their life savings
 Christina Vidal as Detective Ayala, a detective in Skye’s disappearance who shows up to help Danny

Guest
 Ken Kirby as Byron, Carolina's fiancé and son of the Chinese family slated to buy the hotel; the sale and the wedding falls through after Byron learns that Carolina cheated on him with El Rey ("Pilot", "Art of Darkness", "Dear Santiago")
 Eva Longoria Bastón as Beatriz Mendoza, Santiago's late wife and Alicia and Javi's mother, whose family has owned the Riviera Grand Hotel for generations ("Curveball", "Art of Darkness", "Dear Santiago")
 Richard Burgi as Michael Finn, the arrogant owner of the Finn Hotel Group and Santiago's primary competitor ("Love Thy Neighbor", "Where the Sun Don't Shine")
 Freddie Stroma as Oliver, a former classmate of Alicia's who works for Finn as a hotel manager ("Love Thy Neighbor", "Where the Sun Don't Shine")
 Katey Sagal as Teresa Williams, the boss of the crime syndicate to which Santiago owes money ("Groom Service", "Suite Little Lies", "Art of Darkness")
 Cassie Scerbo as Vanessa, a professional cheerleader with whom Jason becomes romantically involved ("Suite Little Lies", "Art of Darkness", "A Perfect Storm")
 Jessalyn Gilsig as Roxanne, Ingrid’s mom who hooked up with Javi (“A Perfect Storm”)

Episodes

Production

Development
On November 21, 2017, it was announced that ABC was developing an American adaptation of the Spanish TV series Gran Hotel. The pilot script for Grand Hotel was set to be written by Brian Tanen who was also set as an executive producer alongside Eva Longoria, Ben Spector, Oliver Bachert, and Christian Gockel. Production companies involved with the pilot include ABC Studios and UnbeliEVAble Entertainment. On February 2, 2018, it was announced that ABC had given the production a pilot order. On February 23, 2018, it was reported that Ken Olin would direct the pilot episode.

On May 11, 2018, it was announced that ABC had given the production a series order. Additionally, it was reported that Ramón Campos and Teresa Fernández-Valdés, producers of the original Spanish series, were joining the series as executive producers. A few days later, it was announced that the series would premiere in the spring of 2019 as a mid-season replacement. On December 12, 2018, it was announced that the series would be held back from mid-season and instead debut during the summer season with a premiere date of June 17, 2019. It was scheduled to air weekly on Mondays during the 10 PM time slot.

On October 1, 2019, Grand Hotel was canceled after one season.

Casting
In February 2018, it was announced that Roselyn Sanchez and Chris Warren had joined the pilot's main cast. In March 2018, it was reported that Demián Bichir, Wendy Raquel Robinson, Shalim Ortiz, Denyse Tontz, Anne Winters, Bryan Craig, Lincoln Younes, Feliz Ramirez, and Justina Adorno had been cast in the pilot's additional main roles. In September 2018, it was announced that Eva Longoria had been cast in a guest starring role and that Jencarlos Canela would appear in a recurring capacity. On November 15, 2018, it was reported that John Marshall Jones, Richard Burgi, and Adrian Pasdar had been cast in recurring roles. In December 2018, it was announced that Katey Sagal, Freddie Stroma, and Ken Kirby had joined the cast in a recurring capacity. Arielle Kebbel appeared in the series as Sky.

Filming
Principal photography for the pilot took place over the course of three weeks in March 2018 at the Fontainebleau Hotel in Miami Beach, Florida. After the pilot was filmed in Miami Beach and ABC picked up a full order of episodes, the cast and crew headed to Los Angeles, California, where a mini-replica of the Fontainebleau was constructed. The exterior shots shown throughout the season are still the real Fontainebleau.

Release
On May 15, 2018, the first official trailer for the series was released. On December 20, 2018, a "first look" still image from the series was released.

Reception

Critical response
On review aggregation Rotten Tomatoes, the series holds an approval rating of 74% with an average rating of 7.01/10, based on 19 reviews. The website's critical consensus reads, "Grand Hotel is a vivacious summer soap, gathering a glamorous ensemble of Latinx talent and letting them bounce off each other in delightfully sordid turns of betrayal." On Metacritic, it has a weighted average score of 60 out of 100, based on 9 critics, indicating "mixed or average reviews".

Ratings

References

External links
 

2010s American mystery television series
2010s American workplace drama television series
2019 American television series debuts
2019 American television series endings
English-language television shows
American Broadcasting Company original programming
Television series by ABC Studios
American television series based on Spanish television series
Television shows set in Miami
Television shows filmed in Los Angeles
Television series set in hotels
Hispanic and Latino American television